Florø TIF (Florø Turn og Idrettsforening) is a sports club from the town of Florø in the municipality of Kinn, Vestland, Norway.  It was founded in 1893. It has sections for athletics, gymnastics, judo, powerlifting, kickboxing, orienteering, volleyball and table tennis.

The athletics section uses Florø Stadion as their home field.

External links
 Official site 

Athletics clubs in Norway
Sport in Sogn og Fjordane
Sports clubs established in 1893
Orienteering clubs in Norway
Kinn
1893 establishments in Norway